Rohit Kumar Mehraulia (born 13 November 1976) is an Indian musician and politician who has served in the Delhi Legislative Assembly since 2020, representing Trilokpuri as a member of the Aam Admi Party.

Member of Legislative Assembly (2020 - present)
Since 2020, he is an elected member of the 7th Delhi Assembly.

Committee assignments of Delhi Legislative Assembly
 Member (2022-2023), Committee on Government Undertakings

Electoral performance

References 
 

1976 births
Aam Aadmi Party MLAs from Delhi
Delhi MLAs 2020–2025
Musicians from Delhi
Indian music educators
Living people
21st-century Indian politicians